Kfir Udi (born 28 August 1979) is an Israeli former footballer who played as a forward.

Career
Udi started his career with Israeli top flight side Hapoel Tel Aviv, helping them win the league, the 1998–99 Israel State Cup, and the 1999–2000 Israel State Cup. In 2003, he trialed for 1. FC Nürnberg in Germany. In 2004, Udi signed for Israeli club Maccabi Petah Tikva , helping them finish second place. In 2006, he returned to Hapoel Tel Aviv in the Israeli top flight.

Before the second half of 2007–08, he signed for Israeli second tier team Hapoel Ramat Gan. In 2008, Udi signed for Hapoel Rishon LeZion in the Israeli third tier, helping them earn promotion to the Israeli second tier.

References

External links
 

1979 births
Living people
Israeli footballers
Association football forwards
Hapoel Tel Aviv F.C. players
Bnei Yehuda Tel Aviv F.C. players
Maccabi Petah Tikva F.C. players
F.C. Ashdod players
Hapoel Ramat Gan F.C. players
Hapoel Rishon LeZion F.C. players
Israel international footballers
Israeli Premier League players
Liga Leumit players
Footballers from Tel Aviv